Je–Tupi–Carib (or TuKaJê) is a proposed language family composed of the  Macro-Je (or Macro-Gê), Tupian and Cariban languages of South America. Aryon Rodrigues (2000) based this proposal on shared morphological patterns. In an earlier proposal, Rodrigues (1985) had also proposed a Tupí-Cariban language family.

The Je-Tupi-Carib proposal replaces earlier long-range hypotheses, e.g. Greenberg's phyla "Jê-Pano-Carib" (linking Macro-Je and Cariban to Panoan) and "Tupi-Arawak" (linking Tupian to Arawakan), or Mason's "Macro-Tupí-Guaranían" family (1950: 236–238) which groups Tupian together with Bora–Witoto and Zaparoan.

However, in some cases, similarities among the language families are clearly due to more recent linguistic diffusion, as with Tupian and Jê languages (Timbira; Guajajara, Tembe, Guaja, Urubu-Ka'apor, etc.) in the lower Tocantins-Mearim area. Linguistic diffusion among Jê, Tupian, Cariban, Arawakan, and Trumai languages is also evident among the languages of the Xingu Indigenous Park.

Comparison

Nikulin (2015)
Comparison of Proto-Macro-Jê (with W = Proto-Western Macro-Jê; E = Proto-Eastern Macro-Jê), Proto-Tupí, and Proto-Karib from Nikulin (2015):

Nikulin (2019)
Jê-Tupí-Cariban basic vocabulary listed by Nikulin (2019):

‘to go’: p-Tupian *to, p-Bororo *tu, p-Cariban *[wɨ]tə[mə]
‘arm’: p-Mundurukú *paʔ, p-Macro-Jê *paC, Chiquitano pa-, p-Kariri *bo(ro-), p-Cariban *apə-rɨ
‘foot’: p-Tupian *py, p-Macro-Jê *pVrV, p-Bororo *bure, Kariri *bɨ(ri-), (?) Chiquitano pope-, (?) p-Cariban *pupu-ru
‘seed’: p-Tuparí-Karitiana *j-upa, p-Cariban *əpɨ (*-tɨpə)
‘stone’: p-Macro-Jê *kra(C), p-Kariri *kro
‘tree’: p-Bororo *i, p-Kariri *dzi
‘to sleep’: p-Jabutí *nũtã, Chiquitano a-nu, p-Bororo *unutu / *-nutu, p-Kariri *-unu, (?) p-Macro-Jê *ũtᵊ

Macro-Chaco hypothesis

Nikulin (2019) suggests a Macro-Chaco hypothesis linking Jê-Tupí-Cariban (including Karirian and Bororoan) with Mataco-Guaicuruan (possibly including Zamucoan):

Macro-Chaco
Macro-Guaicurú
Matacoan
Guaicurú
(?) Zamuco
Jê-Tupí-Cariban
Macro-Tupian
Tupian
Macro-Jê + Chiquitano
Macro-Cariban
Cariban
Karirí
Boróro

In addition to likely shared morphology, there are also various possible Macro-Chaco shared basic vocabulary items, listed below.

‘tooth’: p-Tupian *j-ãc, p-Tupian *j-uñ, p-Bororo *o, Chiquitano oʔo-, p-Cariban *jə, p-Kariri *dza, p-Guaicurú *-owe
‘liquid’: p-Tupian *j-ɯ, Chiquitano uʔu- ‘honey’, p-Matacoan *-ʔi
‘name’: p-Tupian *j-et, p-Tupian *-jet, p-Bororo *idʒe, Kariri *dze, p-Matacoan *-ej, p-Zamocoan *i, (?) Chiquitano ɨri-
‘blood’: p-Tupian *əɯ, p-Tupian *j-O, p-Matacoan *’woj-, p-Guaicurú *-awot, Ayoreo ijo
‘seed’: pre-pMundurukú *j-a, p-Tupian *j-əm, p-Bororo *a, Chiquitano ijo-, p-Chiquitano *a, p-Matacoan *-oʔ, p-Guaicurú -a ‘fruit’

Reconstructed pronominal affixes of the protolanguages of the Macro-Chaco families are given in the following table:

In this table the forms marked with (A) refer to ergative/agentive case, and the forms marked with (O) are referred to absolutive/patient/experiencer case.

References

Proposed language families
Indigenous languages of Eastern Brazil
Indigenous languages of Central Amazonia
Indigenous languages of Northern Amazonia